() is a Lithuanian television mystery music game show based on the South Korean programme of the same name. It premiered on LNK on 13 March 2022 before moving to its sister channel BTV on 30 April 2022.

Gameplay

Format
Presented with a group of six "mystery singers" identified only by their occupation, a guest artist and contestant must attempt to eliminate bad singers from the group without ever hearing them sing, assisted by clues and a celebrity panel over the course of four rounds. At the end of the game, the last remaining mystery singer is revealed as either good or bad by means of a duet between them and one of the guest artists.

Rewards
The contestant must eliminate one mystery singer at the end of each round, receiving  if they eliminate a bad singer. If the singer is bad, the contestant's winnings is given to the bad singer instead.

Rounds
Each episode presents the guest artist and contestant with six people whose identities and singing voices are kept concealed until they are eliminated to perform on the "stage of truth" or remain in the end to perform the final duet.

Production

Background and development
 first announced the development of the series through CJ ENM and Fremantle's joint agreement in November 2020, following the successful broadcasts of Kaukės. It is co-produced by Elitaz and Kaunas Television Services; the staff team is managed by executive producer Agneta Gabalytė, producer Gediminas Jaunius, and director Jurgis Jefremovas.

Filming
Tapings for the programme took place at Avia Solutions Group Arena in Vilnius. Due to the COVID-19 pandemic, it was filmed under health and safety protocols being implemented.

Originally, nine episodes were completed production except one episode involving guest artist  and celebrity panelist , which was never aired according to LNK spokesperson Gediminas Malaškevičius in March 2022 due to their controversial comments related to the Russian invasion of Ukraine.

Episodes

Guest artists

Panelists

Notes

References

International versions of I Can See Your Voice
2020s Lithuanian television series
2022 Lithuanian television series debuts
BTV (Lithuania) original programming
Lithuanian television series based on South Korean television series
LNK (television station) original programming